Tim Manstein (born 25 September 1989) is a German footballer who plays as a midfielder for FC Gütersloh.

Career
Manstein made his professional debut for Rot Weiss Ahlen in the 3. Liga on 9 February 2011, starting in the home match against Hansa Rostock, which finished as a 0–2 away loss.

References

External links
 Profile at DFB.de
 Profile at kicker.de

1989 births
Living people
German footballers
Association football midfielders
Rot Weiss Ahlen players
SC Verl players
Wuppertaler SV players
FC Gütersloh 2000 players
3. Liga players
Regionalliga players